In hyperbolic geometry, a horocycle, sometimes called an oricycle, oricircle, or limit circle, is a curve whose normal or perpendicular geodesics all converge asymptotically in the same direction. It is the two-dimensional case of a horosphere (or orisphere).

The centre of a horocycle is the ideal point where all normal geodesics asymptotically converge. Two horocycles who have the same centre are concentric.
Although it appears as if two concentric horocycles cannot have the same length or curvature, in fact any two horocycles are congruent.

A horocycle can also be described as the limit of the circles that share a tangent in a given point, as their radii go towards infinity. In Euclidean geometry, such a "circle of infinite radius" would be a straight line, but in hyperbolic geometry it is a horocycle (a curve).

From the convex side the horocycle is approximated by hypercycles whose distances from their axis go towards infinity.

Properties 

 Through every pair of points there are 2 horocycles. The centres of the horocycles are the ideal points of the perpendicular bisector of the segment between them.
 No three points of a horocycle are on a line, circle or hypercycle.
 A straight line, circle, hypercycle, or other horocycle cuts a horocycle in at most two points.
 The perpendicular bisector of a chord of a horocycle is a normal of the horocycle and it bisects the arc subtended by the chord.
 The length of an arc of a horocycle between two points is:
 longer than the length of the line segment between those two points,
 longer than the length of the arc of a hypercycle between those two points and
 shorter than the length of any circle arc between those two points.

 The distance from a horocycle to its center is infinite, and while in some models of hyperbolic geometry it looks like the two "ends" of a horocycle get closer and closer together and closer to its center, this is not true; the two "ends" of a horocycle get further and further away from each other.
 A regular apeirogon is circumscribed by either a horocycle or a hypercycle.
 If C is the centre of a horocycle and A and B are points on the horocycle then the angles CAB and CBA are equal.
 The area of a sector of a horocycle (the area between two radii and the horocycle) is finite.

Standardized Gaussian curvature 

When the hyperbolic plane has the standardized Gaussian curvature K of −1:

 The length s of an arc of a horocycle between two points is:
 where d is the distance between the two points, and sinh and cosh are hyperbolic functions.

 The length of an arc of a horocycle such that the tangent at one extremity is limiting parallel to the radius through the other extremity is 1. the area enclosed between this horocycle and the radii is 1.
 The ratio of the arc lengths between two radii of two concentric horocycles where the horocycles are a distance 1 apart is e : 1.

Representations in models of hyperbolic geometry

Poincaré disk model
In the Poincaré disk model of the hyperbolic plane, horocycles are represented by circles tangent to the boundary circle; the centre of the horocycle is the ideal point where the horocycle touches the boundary circle.

The compass and straightedge construction of the two horocycles through two points is the same construction of the CPP construction for the Special cases of Apollonius' problem where both points are inside the circle.

Poincaré half-plane model
In the Poincaré half-plane model, horocycles are represented by circles tangent to the boundary line, in which case their centre is the ideal point where the circle touches the boundary line.

When the centre of the horocycle is the ideal point at  then the horocycle is a line parallel to the boundary line.

The compass and straightedge construction in the first case is the same construction as the LPP construction for the Special cases of Apollonius' problem.

Hyperboloid model
In the hyperboloid model they are represented by intersections of the hyperboloid with planes whose normal lies in the asymptotic cone.

Metric
If the metric is normalized to have Gaussian curvature −1, then the horocycle is a curve of geodesic curvature 1 at every point.

See also

 Horosphere
 Hypercycle (geometry)

References

 H. S. M. Coxeter (1961) Introduction to Geometry, §16.6: "Circles, horocycles, and equidistant curves", page 300, 1, John Wiley & Sons.
 Four Pillars of Geometry p. 198

Hyperbolic geometry
Curves